The South Russian Government was a Russian White movement government established by Armed Forces of South Russia commander Anton Denikin in Novorossiysk, Kuban, in March 1920 during the Russian Civil War.

On 27 March 1920, Denikin was forced to evacuate Novorossiysk for Crimea, which the Whites had controlled since June 1919.  However, the slipshod retreat discredited Denikin and he stepped down, succeeded by General Pyotr Wrangel, who was elected new Commander-in-Chief of the White Army by military council.  The South Russian Government was dissolved on 30 March in Feodosiya. Wrangel set up a new Government of South Russia in Sevastopol in April.

This attempted establishment of civil government by the White authorities was a recognition that previous neglect of civil administration by the General Command of the Armed Forces of South Russia had cost the Whites civilian support.

See also
 History of Crimea
 Russian Civil War
 Post-Russian Empire states

References

1920 disestablishments in Europe
Former unrecognized countries
States and territories established in 1920
South Russia
1920 in Ukraine
History of Crimea
Russian Civil War